The  is a botanical garden located in Tateyama, Chiba, Japan. It is open daily; an admission fee is charged.

The garden is associated with the Michi no eki Nambō off of Chiba Prefectural Highway 257, nicknamed the “Flower Route”. Operated by the Chiba Prefectural Government, the complex consists of a golf course, family park, as well as the botanical gardens.

Within the botanical garden portion of the complex are several greenhouses plus an outdoor area with observation tower, petting zoo, ponds, etc. The greenhouses exhibit tropical plants, butterflies, and birds. A Singapore Orchid House and Merlion statue reflect the garden's association with the Singapore Botanic Gardens.

References 
Aloha Garden Tateyama (Japanese)
 Tateyama City Guide article

See also 
 List of botanical gardens in Japan

Botanical gardens in Japan
Gardens in Chiba Prefecture
Greenhouses in Japan
Tateyama, Chiba